J. F. Thompson may refer to:

James Frederick Thompson (1884–1966), New Zealand solicitor and politician
Joe F. Thompson, American aerospace engineer